Refuge des Écrins is a refuge in the Alps, in the French department of Hautes-Alpes. It stands at 3170 metres high, above the Glacier Blanc. Access usually is from the village of Ailefroide in the French Alps and a 2-hour hike further than the Refuge du Glacier Blanc.
 
The hut trail runs for the most part immediately above the glacier and should only be attempted by fully equipped high-altitude alpinists because of the danger of falling into a crevasse. The high alpine base with 119 beds is often overbooked during the peak season.

Mountain huts in the Alps
Mountain huts in France